Genophantis is a genus of moths belonging to the family Pyralidae. All species are endemic to Hawaii.

Species
Genophantis iodora Meyrick, 1888
Genophantis leahi Swezey, 1910

External links

Phycitinae
Endemic moths of Hawaii
Taxonomy articles created by Polbot
Pyralidae genera
Taxa named by Edward Meyrick